"Neighbors" is a song by American rapper Pooh Shiesty, released on February 2, 2021 as the third single from his debut mixtape, Shiesty Season, which was released three days later. The song features American rapper Big30 and was produced by American producer C-Mo. A music video for the song was released on February 4, 2021; it features a cameo from American rapper Lil Baby.

Composition and critical reception
In the song, Pooh Shiesty and Big30 rap about keeping and using their guns, as well as their luxury, over an "uptempo synth instrumental". Aaron Williams of Uproxx wrote that Shiesty "offers up his take on the trap rap staples of choppers, racks, and work, boasting that he keeps his gun closer than a neighbor and threatening anyone 'talking gangster on the net.'"

Charts

Certifications

References

2021 singles
2021 songs
Pooh Shiesty songs
Atlantic Records singles
BIG30 songs
Songs written by BIG30
Songs written by Pooh Shiesty
Trap music songs